Thanatocoenosis (from Greek language thanatos - death and koinos - common) are all the embedded fossils at a single discovery site. This site may be referred to as a death assemblage. Such groupings are composed of fossils of organisms which may not have been associated during life, often originating from different habitats. Examples include marine fossils having been brought together by a water current or animal bones having been deposited by a predator.

References
Concise Encyclopedia - Biology, Thomas A. Scott,

See also
 Biocoenosis, a life assemblage

Biology terminology